The lunar limb is the edge of the visible surface (disc) of the Moon as viewed from Earth. Libration of the Moon, with its irregular surface, leads to small changes in its profile; this complicates the task of precisely calculating eclipse times and durations. However, data from the mapping of the lunar surface allows astronomers to predict the lunar profile for any given time with a high degree of certainty. The irregularity of the lunar limb is the cause of Baily's beads, which are collimated rays of sunlight that shine through in some places while not in others during a solar eclipse.

The contrast of the lunar disc, brightly illuminated by direct sunlight, against a black night sky makes it a popular target when testing telescope (including binocular) optics.

References

Moon